The Roland U-110 is a ROMpler synthesizer module that was produced by Roland Corporation in 1988.

General information
The predecessor of the more successful U-20 keyboard and U-220 module, the U-110 was Roland's first dedicated sample playback synth. It used ROM to store sounds rather than loading them from disks into RAM, hence it was not a true sampler as it could not sample sounds.

The U-110 contained a base 2MB of sounds stored in ROM. It could be expanded with up to four  Roland SN-U110 sound library cards, unlike the more popular Roland U-220 that could only accommodate two. It had six individual outputs, allowing for each instrument channel to be recorded separately, and two mix outputs to output all channels as a stereo pair.

Specifications

List of SN-U110 ROM Cards

References

External links
Vintage Synth Explorer's site on the U-110 
U-110 Manual 
Vintage synth explorer 
Synthmania's site contains the demo songs on MP3 
U110 Resource: Manual, many audio demos and review 

U-20
D
MIDI instruments
Polyphonic synthesizers
Digital synthesizers
Samplers (musical instrument)
Musical instruments invented in the 1980s
U-110